William Maughan and Anna Varslavane are a couple who disappeared on 14 April 2015 from the Gormanstown area of County Meath.

Background
William "Willie" Maughan was originally from Tallaght. He was 34.

Anastasija "Anna" Varslavane was originally from Latvia but had lived in Ireland for several years. She was 21.

Disappearance
They had been living together in Gormanston, Co. Meath, and were on their way to meet William's mother to get a lift to Tallaght.

On 14 April 2015 Anna rang William's mother at 2:57pm. One of her sons answered and he could hear Anna calling for help.

Ten minutes later the Maughan family arrived at the agreed pickup point but neither William or Anna were there.

Investigation
Gardaí suspect the couple were murdered on orders from a figure who has since become involved in the Drogheda feud. They suspect that he was behind the fatal shooting of Benny Whitehouse in Balbriggan in 2014 and that the couple were killed because the gang feared that they would provide information to the Gardaí about the shooting of Whitehouse.

William's parents Joseph and Helen have made appeals about the disappearance of their son and his girlfriend. Joseph Maughan believes that his son was targeted because he knew too much about a murder that happened in 2014.

In August 2016 the grave of William's younger brother Michael "Bobby" Maughan was dug up in what the family believe was an attempt at intimidation by the gang responsible for the disappearance. The vandalism happened in the early hours of the morning the day after Joseph Maughan appealed for information on the disappearance of William. Three men entered Bohernabreena Cemetery after 2am and started digging up the grave, though Michael's remains were not removed from it. Michael Maughan died as a result of meningitis.

In 2017 Gardaí examined a site in County Louth as one line of investigation.

On 28 April 2020 a man in his 50s was arrested and held at Ashbourne Garda station. He could be questioned for up to seven days. It is the first arrest in the investigation.

On 8 July 2020 three men, in their twenties, fifties and sixties and a woman in her forties were arrested and held in Garda stations in Meath and Dublin in relation to the case. Searches that took place at a location in Meath were completed on the same date. On 10 July 2020 they were released. Gardaí will prepare files for the Director of Public Prosecutions, who will decide on whether to prosecute.

See also 
 List of people who disappeared

References

External links
 press release from the Garda Síochána concerning the disappearance

2010s missing person cases
2015 in Ireland
April 2015 events in Europe
Kidnapping in Ireland
Couples
Crime in County Meath
Latvian expatriates in the Republic of Ireland
Missing person cases in Ireland
People from Tallaght
Unsolved crimes in Ireland